Clive Caldwell is a squash player from Canada. He was one of the leading hardball squash players in North America in the late-1970s and early-1980s.

Caldwell was the first leading professional player to adopt the oversized racquet head, which is now the standard in modern squash.

See also 
World Squash Doubles Championships

References 

Canadian male squash players
Living people
Year of birth missing (living people)